Jaiswal or Jayswal or Jayaswal may refer to one of several communities in India including:

Jaiswal Brahmin
Jaiswal Jain
Jaiswal (surname)